Comba may refer to:

People 
A saint named Comba in Galician language, a fusion of two female saints: Columba of Sens and Columba of Spain.
Comba (surname), an Italian surname

Places 
Comba (Lycia), ancient city of Lycia
Comba, Goa, town and suburb of the city of Margao, India

Space 
7636 Comba

See also
Combas
Robert Combas (born 1957), French painter and sculptor
Santa Comba (disambiguation), the name of several places
Combi (disambiguation)